Lamin Sarjo Samateh (born 20 December 1993) is a Gambian football defender playing with Samger FC.

Born in Fajara is career started in a local club S. Vlaer Tallinding helping them to win a series of junior league titles. He made such an impact that he became the team captain before moving to Samger FC in 2006. Samateh helped Samger FC to win the Gambian Super Cup, and a year later the club finished runner-up in the 2007-08 Gambian Championnat National D1. Scoring 11 goals in the 2010 Gambian Championship helped him win, for the second consecutive time, the SJAG Player of the Year Award.
  
At the national team level, he was part of the Gambian team at the 2009 FIFA U-17 World Cup. Earlier, he helped Gambia U-17 win the Pepsi Academy Football Tournament. He became part of the Gambian U-20 team that ensured qualification to the 2011 Championship in South Africa.

On March 29, 2011, he received a call for representing the Gambian national team.

On March 17, 2019, he announced his retirement from football, at the age of 25.

References

External sources

1993 births
Living people
Gambian footballers
Association football midfielders